Aykut Kaya (born June 15, 1990) is a European champion Turkish karateka competing in the kumite -60 kg division. He is a member of the İstanbul B.B. SK. He is a student at Sakarya University.

Kaya became champion at the 2013 European Championships held on May 9–12 in Budapest, Hungary.

Achievements
2013
  48th European Championships - May 9, Budapest, HUN - kumite -60 kg

2012
  16th Balkan Children & Seniors Karate Championships - March 16, Herceg Novi, MNE - kumite -60 kg

2011
  3rd Under 21 European Cup - February 11, Novi Sad, SRB - kumite junior -68 kg
  46th European Championships - May 6, Zurich, SUI - kumite -60 kg

2008
  35th European Junior & Cadet Karate Championships - February 15, Trieste, ITA - kumite cadet -60 kg

2007
  34th European Junior & Cadet Karate Championships - February 9, İzmir, TUR - kumite cadet -60 kg

References

1990 births
Sportspeople from Istanbul
Living people
Turkish male karateka
Istanbul Büyükşehir Belediyespor athletes
Sakarya University alumni
Islamic Solidarity Games competitors for Turkey
21st-century Turkish people